The Anglesey Football League was a football league in Anglesey, Wales, and was equivalent to the sixth level of the Welsh football league system in North Wales. The champions were promoted to the Gwynedd League.

The league also runs five cup competitions which are (Current holders in brackets) Lucas Oil Cup (Bryngwran Bulls), Dargie Cup (Bryngwran Bulls), Elias Cup (Arriva Bangor), Megan Cup (Holyhead Hotspur Reserves) and the Bwlch Car Boot Trophy (Arriva Bangor).

League members also compete in the North Wales Coast Junior Cup against fellow league members and members from the Caernarfon & District League and the Clwyd League.

The league folded in 2020 due to a reorganisation of the Welsh football league pyramid, with many teams joining the North Wales Coast West Football League.

Member clubs for the final 2019–20 season 

Arriva Bangor 
Bodorgan 
Cemaes Bay 
Cefni 
Holyhead Town reserves
Holyhead Hotspur reserves 
Llandegfan 
Llanfairpwll
Mountain Rangers 
Pentraeth reserves 
Valley Athletic

League Champions 
Information sourced from Welsh Soccer Archive

1890s

1897–98 – Menai Bridge

1900s

 Tables/ league status unknown

1910s

1910–11 –
1911–12 –
1912–13 – League running but champions unknown
1913–14 – 
1914–15 – Football suspended due to the First World War
1915–16 – Football suspended due to the First World War
1916–17 – Football suspended due to the First World War
1917–18 – Football suspended due to the First World War
1918–19 – 
1919–20 –

1920s

1920–21 – 
1921–22 – Holyhead Alexandra Rovers
1922–23 – Beaumaris St Marys
1923–24 – Llanfairpwll
1924–25 – Beaumaris
1925–26 – 
1926–27 – 
1927–28 – League not operating
1928–29 – Menai Bridge
1929–30 – Beaumaris

1930s

1930–31 – Newborough
1931–32 – 
1932–33 – 
1933–34 – Llangefni
1934–35 – Holyhead Railway Institute
1935–36 – 
1936–37 – 
1937–38 – Llandegfan
1938–39 – Llangefni
1939–40 – Football suspended due to the Second World War

1940s

1940–41 – Football suspended due to the Second World War
1941–42 – Football suspended due to the Second World War
1942–43 – Football suspended due to the Second World War
1943–44 – Football suspended due to the Second World War
1944–45 – Football suspended due to the Second World War
1945–46 – Football suspended due to the Second World War
1946–47 – Amlwch Town (fixtures not completed)
1947–48 – Amlwch Town 
1948–49 – Amlwch Town 
1949–50 – Amlwch Town

1950s

1950–51 – Amlwch Town 
1951–52 – Llangefni
1952–53 – Aberffraw
1953–54 – Llanfairpwll
1954–55 – Newborough
1955–56 – Newborough
1956–57 – Gwalchmai 
1957–58 – Newborough
1958–59 – Gwalchmai 
1959–60 – Gwalchmai

1960s

1960–61 – Newborough
1961–62 – Brynsiencyn
1962–63 – Brynsiencyn
1963–64 – Aberffraw
1964–65 – Newborough
1965–66 – Newborough
1966–67 – Newborough
1967–68 – Holyhead Town reserves
1968–69 – Newborough
1969–70 – Holyhead Town reserves

1970s

1970–71 – Amlwch Town 
1971–72 – Amlwch Town 
1972–73 – Llangoed & District
1973–74 – Llandegfan
1974–75 – Llanfairpwll
1975–76 – Llanfairpwll
1976–77 – Llanfairpwll
1977–78 – Beaumaris Town
1978–79 – Beaumaris Town
1979–80 – Holyhead Town

1980s

1980–81 – Llangefni
1981–82 – Llanfairpwll
1982–83 – Llanfairpwll
1983–84 – Llanerch-y-medd
1984–85 – Llanerch-y-medd
1985–86 – Holyhead Town
1986–87 – Gwalchmai   
1987–88 – Holyhead Town
1988–89 – Llangoed & District
1989–90 – Gwalchmai

1990s

1990–91 – Bodedern
1991–92 – Bodedern
1992–93 – Llangefni Town reserves
1993–94 – Gwalchmai
1994–95 – Holyhead Hotspur
1995–96 – Holyhead Hotspur
1996–97 – Amlwch Town 
1997–98 – Gwalchmai 
1998–99 – Bodedern 
1999-2000 – Cemaes Bay reserves

2000s

2000–01 – Gwalchmai 
2001–02 – Beaumaris Town	
2002–03 – Llangefni-Glantraeth reserves 
2003–04 – Holyhead Gwelfor Athletic 
2004–05 – Gaerwen 
2005–06 – Amlwch Town 
2006–07 – Holyhead Gwelfor Athletic 
2007–08 – Gwalchmai
2008–09 – Pentraeth Nurseries 
2009–10 – Bro Goronwy

2010s

2010-11 – Trearddur Bay United
2011–12 – Morawelon 
2012–13 – Pentraeth
2013–14 – Menai Bridge Tigers
2014–15 – Valley
2015–16 – Bro Goronwy 
2016–17 – Holyhead Town
2017–18 – Mynydd Tigers 
2018–19 – Bryngwran Bulls
2019-20 – Cemaes Bay

Dargie Cup Champions 

1922–23: – Benllech
1923–24: – Llanfairpwll
1924–25: – Holyhead Albion
1925–26: – Beaumaris
1926-27: –
1927-28: –
1928–29: – Menai Bridge
1929–30: – Beaumaris
1930–31: – 
1931–32: – Holyhead United
1932–33: – Penmon
1933–34: – Llangefni
1934–35: – Holyhead Railway Institute
1935–36: – No competition
1936–37: – No competition
1937–38: – Gaerwen
1938–39: – Llangefni
1939–40: – Competition suspended - World War Two
1940–41: – Competition suspended - World War Two
1941–42: – Competition suspended - World War Two
1942–43: – Competition suspended - World War Two
1943–44: – Competition suspended - World War Two
1944–45: – Competition suspended - World War Two
1945–46: – Competition suspended - World War Two
1946–47: – Llangefni
1947–48: – Beaumaris
1948–49: – Aberffraw
1949–50: – Aberffraw
1950–51: – Llangefni
1951–62: – Aberffraw
1955–56: – Newborough
1956–57: – Newborough
1958–59: – Newborough
1960–61: – Gwalchmai
1961–62: – Newborough
1962–63: – Aberffraw
1963–64: – Aberffraw
1964–65: – Newborough
1965–66: – Newborough
1966–67: – Newborough
1967–68: – Amlwch Town
1968–69: – Amlwch Town
1969–70: – Llangoed & District
1970–71: – Llangoed & District
1971–72: – Newborough
1972–73: – Newborough Amateurs
1973–74: – Llanfairpwll
1974–75: – Llanfairpwll
1975–76: – Llanfairpwll
1976–77: – Llanfairpwll
1977–78: – Beaumaris Town
1978–79: – Menai Bridge Tigers
1979–80: – Holyhead United Juniors
1980–81: – Bodedern Athletic
1981–82: – Llanfairpwll
1982–83: – Gwalchmai
1983–84: – Llandegfan
1984–85: – Llangoed & District
1985–86: – Llanerch-y-medd
1986–87: – Holyhead Town
1987–88: – Holyhead Town
1988–89: – Llangoed & District
1989–90: – Amlwch Town
1990–91: – Bodedern Athletic
1991–92: – Trearddur Bay United
1992–93: – Llandegfan
1993–94: – Holyhead Hotspur
1994–95: – Llannerchymedd Bulls
1995–96: – Holyhead Hotspur
1996–97: – Gwalchmai
1997–98: – Final not played due to protest
1998–99: – Bodedern Athletic
1999–2000: – Cemaes Bay reserves
2000–01: – Gwalchmai
2001–02: – Beaumaris Town
2002–03: – Llangefni-Glantraeth reserves
2003–04: – Gaerwen
2004–05: – Amlwch Town
2005–06: – Holyhead Gwelfor Athletic
2006–07: – Bodedern reserves
2007–08: – Bro Goronwy
2008–09: – Trearddur Bay United
2009–10: – Trearddur Bay United
2010–11: – Trearddur Bay United
2011–12: – Llanerch-y-medd
2012–13: – Pentraeth
2013–14: – Llangefni Town Reserves
2014–15: – Cemaes Bay
2015–16: – Llanfairpwll reserves
2016–17: – Llangoed & District
2017–18: – Bryngwran Bulls
2018–19: – Caergybi
2019–20: – Final not played due to Covid-19 pandemic

References

 
Sport in Anglesey
Wales
2020 disestablishments in Wales
1895 establishments in Wales
Sports leagues disestablished in 2020
Sports leagues established in 1895
Defunct football competitions in Wales